Adrian Cruciat (born 31 March 1983) is former a Romanian tennis player. On 16 June 2008 he reached his highest ATP singles ranking of 148. He retired in 2012, and in 2013 he became a television pundit for Digi Sport.

ATP Challenger Tour singles finals: 1 (0–1)

Runners-up (1)

External links

 
 
 
 

1983 births
Living people
Sportspeople from Timișoara
Romanian male tennis players
21st-century Romanian people